Ralph Milton Beard Jr. (December 2, 1927 – November 29, 2007) was an American collegiate and professional basketball player.
He won two NCAA national basketball championships at the University of Kentucky and played two years in the National Basketball Association prior to being barred for life for his participation in the 1951 point shaving scandal.

Early life
Beard was born in Hardinsburg, Kentucky. Beard grew up in Louisville and attended Louisville Male High School. He later cited the family's finances as a reason he took money from gamblers. His mother worked as a cleaning lady after his father left the family.

College career 
He was a member of Adolph Rupp's "Fabulous Five" University of Kentucky basketball team, with Alex Groza, Wallace Jones, Cliff Barker, and Kenny Rollins. Beard won a gold medal in the 1948 Summer Olympics with the Fabulous Five and the Phillips 66ers.

Professional career

Indianapolis Olympians (1949–1951) 

Taken in the second round of the 1949 NBA draft, Beard played two seasons with the Indianapolis Olympians and averaged 15.9 points and 4.4 assists per game.

CCNY point shaving scandal 
In October 1951, authorities charged him along with his former teammates Alex Groza and Dale Barnstable with taking bribes as part of the 1951 NCAA point shaving scandal. They pleaded guilty and received suspended sentences but the NBA Commissioner Maurice Podoloff banned all three for life from the NBA. Beard admitted that he took $700 but denied that he had ever shaved points in a game. He claimed that Frank Hogan, the New York district attorney, conspired with Podoloff of the NBA and Cardinal Francis Spellman, the Archbishop of New York to go after Midwestern players in an effort to protect players at Catholic colleges.

Aftermath 
He worked in the pharmaceutical industry afterward. His only involvement in the sport after his ban was some scouting work with the Kentucky Colonels of the American Basketball Association. He tried playing professional baseball but his ban for gambling prevented him from that sport as well.

NBA career statistics

Regular season

Playoffs

Personal life 
Later in life, the University of Kentucky welcomed Beard back. The school retired his jersey  and invited him to speak to players about point shaving.

In 1985, he was inducted into the Kentucky Athletic Hall of Fame.

Beard died on November 29, 2007 at his Louisville, Kentucky home.

References

External links
 

Ralph Beard profile
Ralph Beard Info Page at NBA.com

1927 births
2007 deaths
All-American college men's basketball players
American men's basketball players
Banned National Basketball Association players
Basketball players at the 1948 Summer Olympics
Basketball players from Louisville, Kentucky
College basketball controversies in the United States
Chicago Stags draft picks
Guards (basketball)
Indianapolis Olympians players
Kentucky Wildcats men's basketball players
Louisville Male High School alumni
Medalists at the 1948 Summer Olympics
National Basketball Association All-Stars
Olympic gold medalists for the United States in basketball
People from Hardinsburg, Kentucky
United States men's national basketball team players